Fort Reynolds can refer to the following:

Fort Reynolds (California) or Camp Reynolds on Angel Island, California, USA
Fort Reynolds (Colorado) near Avondale, Colorado, USA
Fort Reynolds (Virginia) in Arlington County, Virginia, USA